Heather E. "Hedy" Burress (born October 3, 1973) is an American retired actress.  She had a starring role in the film Foxfire as Maddy, and later landed roles in television shows Boston Common and E.R. In the video game world, she is best known as the English voice of leading character Yuna in Final Fantasy X and its sequel Final Fantasy X-2.

Life and career
Burress was born in Edwardsville, Illinois on October 3, 1973 to teacher parents. She attended Millikin University in Decatur, Illinois, before relocating to Los Angeles, in 1995.

She made her film debut in the 1996 film Foxfire, starring opposite Angelina Jolie and Peter Facinelli. Burress auditioned for the role of Dorothy Wheeler in the motion picture Valentine, but the role went to Jessica Capshaw. However, director Jamie Blanks still wanted Burress to star in the film.  During a meeting, they looked each other in the eye and both said, "Ruthie", resulting in Burress having the role of Ruthie Walker.

In television, she co-starred in the short-lived NBC sitcom Boston Common and has made many guest appearances in various television shows. Hedy Burress was a recurring cast member in the final season of the acclaimed medical drama  E.R.. She then went on to become a recurring cast member of the acclaimed police drama  Southland.

Burress performs many voice-over roles. She is best is known by video game players as the English voice actress of Yuna in the PlayStation 2 games Final Fantasy X and Final Fantasy X-2, and reprised the role in later releases, such as Kingdom Hearts II and Dissidia 012 Final Fantasy.

Burress is also an accomplished theater actress appearing in many plays and musicals in the Los Angeles area.

Personal life
Burress married Gary Fullerton, USMC in October 2000. In July 2004, Fullerton died in a jet crash.

Filmography

Film

Television

Video games

References

External links
 
 
 

1973 births
Living people
20th-century American actresses
21st-century American actresses
Actresses from Illinois
American film actresses
American television actresses
American voice actresses
American video game actresses
Millikin University alumni
People from Edwardsville, Illinois
Actresses from Los Angeles